Park Ju-won (Korean: 박주원; Hanja: 朴柱源 RR: Bak Juwon; born 6 October 1958) is a South Korean politician who served as the 11th Mayor of Ansan. He also served as the Secretary-General of the short-lived Onward for Future 4.0.

Early life and education 
Park was born on October 6, 1958 in Gochang-gun, North Jeolla Province, South Korea. He graduated from Korea University with a degree in law.

Political career 
Park was elected Mayor of Ansan in 2006 with 51.23% of the popular vote, he ran under the Grand National Party. After his term as Mayor of Ansan ended in 2010, he was involved in a corruption scandal for alleged money laundering. He was sentenced to 6 years in prison and a fine of ₩130,000,000. This sentence was later overturned by the Supreme Court of Korea.

In 2019, he was appointed as Secretary-General of Onward for Future 4.0; he was the first and last Secretary-General for the short-lived party.

References 

1958 births
Living people
South Korean politicians